The 1871 Plymouth by-election was held on 22 November 1871.  The byelection was fought due to the resignation in order to become a Justice of the Court of Common Pleas of the incumbent Liberal MP, Robert Collier.  It was won by the Conservative candidate Edward Bates.

References

1871 in England
Elections in Plymouth, Devon
1871 elections in the United Kingdom
By-elections to the Parliament of the United Kingdom in Devon constituencies
19th century in Plymouth, Devon
November 1871 events